Estación del Norte may refer to:

Estación del Norte (Barcelona)
Estación del Norte (Burgos), Burgos
Príncipe Pío (Madrid Metro) (Estación del Norte)
Oviedo railway station (Estación del Norte)
San Sebastián railway station (Estación del Norte)
Estació del Nord (Valencia)
Estación del Norte (Zaragoza)

See also
 
 North Station (disambiguation)
 Nordbahnhof (disambiguation)
 Gare du Nord (disambiguation)